"How Do You Sleep?" is a song by English rock musician John Lennon from his 1971 album Imagine. The song makes angry and scathing remarks aimed at his former Beatles bandmate and songwriting partner, Paul McCartney. Lennon wrote the song in response to what he perceived as personal slights by McCartney on the latter's Ram album. The track includes a slide guitar solo played by George Harrison and was co-produced by Lennon, Phil Spector and Yoko Ono.

Composition and lyrics
John Lennon wrote "How Do You Sleep?" in the aftermath of Paul McCartney's successful suit in the London High Court to dissolve the Beatles as a legal partnership. This ruling had followed the publication of Lennon's defamatory remarks about the Beatles in a December 1970 interview with Rolling Stone magazine, and McCartney and his wife, Linda, taking full-page advertisements in the music press, in which, as an act of mockery towards Lennon and Yoko Ono, they were shown wearing clown costumes and wrapped up in a bag. Following the release of McCartney's album Ram in May 1971, Lennon felt attacked by McCartney, who later admitted that lines in the song "Too Many People" were intended as digs at Lennon. Lennon thought that other songs on the album, such as "3 Legs", contained similar attacks although McCartney denied it.

The lyrics of "How Do You Sleep?" refer to the "Paul is dead" rumour ("Those freaks was right when they said you was dead"). The song begins with the line "So Sgt. Pepper took you by surprise", referring to the Beatles' landmark 1967 album. Preceding this first line are ambient sounds evocative of those heard at the beginning of the Sgt. Pepper's Lonely Hearts Club Band album.

The lyrics "The only thing you done was yesterday / And since you've gone you're just another day" are directed at McCartney, referencing the Beatles' 1965 song "Yesterday" and McCartney's hit single "Another Day", released in February 1971. Lennon initially penned the lyrics "You probably pinched that bitch anyway", as a reference to McCartney's claims that he was not sure if he had plagiarized "Yesterday", having asked Lennon, Harrison, George Martin and others if they had heard that melody before. Although Lennon received the sole writing credit for "How Do You Sleep?", a contemporary account by Felix Dennis of Oz magazine indicates that Yoko Ono, as well as Allen Klein, Lennon's manager, also contributed lyrics.

Recording
Lennon recorded "How Do You Sleep?" on 26 May 1971 at Ascot Sound Studios, during the sessions for his Imagine album. String overdubs took place on 4 July 1971 at the Record Plant, in New York City. The song features a slide guitar part played by George Harrison. Aside from Lennon on rhythm guitar and vocals, the track also includes contributions from Klaus Voormann on bass, Alan White on drums, acoustic guitar played by Ted Turner, Rod Linton and Andy Davis, as well as additional piano parts by Nicky Hopkins and John Tout. Although he had been united with Lennon, Ringo Starr and Klein, against McCartney, in the recent lawsuit, Harrison recalled that the period was one of "very strange, intense feelings" among all the former Beatles, and he was initially wary of Lennon's invitation to play on the new album. Given this, Harrison added, he was relieved that Lennon was "openly pleased I came".

As with all the tracks on Imagine, several outtakes of "How Do You Sleep?" became available on bootleg albums and in documentary films about Lennon. A run-through of the song in the 2000 film Gimme Some Truth includes what authors Chip Madinger and Mark Easter describe as "John's query to Paul", as Lennon faces the camera and sings: "How do you sleep, ya cunt?" Starr visited the studio during the recording of the song and was reportedly upset, saying: "That's enough, John." The final mix version as released on the album is in mono rather than stereo, unlike all the other tracks. In 2018, two versions of the original recording sessions were released in 5.1 surround sound as part of the Imagine box set.

Reception and aftermath
In a contemporary review of Imagine, Ben Gerson of Rolling Stone highlighted "How Do You Sleep?" among the album's three "really worthy, musically effective numbers" but found it "horrifying and indefensible" as a song that "lay waste to Paul's character, family and career". Gerson concluded: "The motives for 'Sleep' are baffling. Partly it is the traditional bohemian contempt for the bourgeois; partly it is the souring of John's long-standing competitive relationship with Paul." Writing in the NME, Alan Smith said of the track: "Musically, it's tremendous – open, big, powerful, thundering, dramatic – but this is a song which will be remembered for its lyrics …" As its ultimate putdown of McCartney, Smith identified the couplet "The sound you make is muzak to my ears / You must've learned something in all those years." In Melody Maker, Roy Hollingworth lauded Imagine as the best work that Lennon had ever done and described "How Do You Sleep?" as "the unnerving slash at McCartney … a slow funk with Commanche or maybe Sioux flavoured strings".

A few months after the album was released, Lennon said that the song "was an answer to Ram" but added: 

In 1980, Lennon stated: "I used my resentment against Paul … to create a song … not a terrible vicious horrible vendetta … I used my resentment and withdrawing from Paul and The Beatles, and the relationship with Paul, to write 'How Do You Sleep'. I don't really go 'round with those thoughts in my head all the time".

Personnel
John Lennon – vocals, guitar
George Harrison – slide guitar
Nicky Hopkins – Wurlitzer electric piano
John Tout – piano
Ted Turner – acoustic guitar
Rod Linton – acoustic guitar
Andy Davis – acoustic guitar
Klaus Voormann – bass
Alan White – drums
The Flux Fiddlers – strings

References

1971 songs
John Lennon songs
Songs about musicians
Songs about the Beatles
Songs written by John Lennon
Song recordings produced by John Lennon
Song recordings produced by Phil Spector
Song recordings produced by Yoko Ono
Diss tracks
Answer songs